Hollinger may refer to:

Places
Hollinger, Nebraska, a community in the United States

Businesses 
Hollinger Inc., the Canadian holding company that owns the Sun-Times Media Group
Hollinger International, the former name of the Sun-Times Media Group
Hollinger Mines, a Canadian mining company

People
Hollinger of Sweden (disambiguation), various princes
David Hollinger, a professor at the University of California, Berkeley
John Hollinger, VP of Basketball Operations for the Memphis Grizzlies and former basketball writer for ESPN.com
Dennis Hollinger, president of Gordon–Conwell Theological Seminary